Polytechnic University of the Philippines – San Pedro Campus (PUP-SPC) is one of the campus units of the Polytechnic University of the Philippines located in San Pedro, Laguna, Philippines. It is one of the four PUP municipality-funded campuses in Laguna; the others are PUP Biñan Campus, PUP Santa Rosa Campus, and PUP Calauan Campus.

History 
PUP San Pedro Campus was established on April 9, 2002, as an open university center by virtue of a memorandum of agreement signed by then-Mayor Felicismo A. Vierneza of San Pedro, Laguna and then PUP President Ofelia M. Carague. PUP San Pedro initially offered a single curricular program, Bachelor of Science in Entrepreneurial Management. Two sections totaling 119 students enrolled in the courses were housed in a borrowed two-room building at the San Pedro Manpower Training Center (SPMTC) at the Elvinda Subdivision. Around 120 chairs were donated by then Laguna governor Teresita Lazaro.

Campus 
The San Pedro, Laguna campus of PUP has an Eco Park and Butterfly Sanctuary.

Academics 

College of Education (COED)
 Bachelor of Science in Secondary Education (BSEd) Major in Mathematics and English

College of Business (CB)
 Bachelor of Science in Entrepreneurship (BSE)
 Bachelor of Science in Business Administration (BSBA) Major in Marketing Management
 Bachelor of Science in Business Administration (BSBA) Major in Human Resource Management

College of Computer Management and Information Technology (CCMIT)
 Bachelor of Science in Information Technology (BSIT)

College of Accountancy (COA)
 Bachelor of Science in Accountancy

Extracurricular activity 
The Polytechnic University of the Philippines San Pedro Campus annually conducts their Quest For Excellence Also known as Q4E in which students will participate into three categories (Academics, Sports, and Arts) to showcase not only their intellectual ability but also their skills and talents. The students are divided according to their respective organization to win an individual categorized competition. The Organization that gathers the most points will hail as Best Organization and will receive the Directors Cup.

References

External links 
 Polytechnic University of the Philippines – Official website

Polytechnic University of the Philippines
Universities and colleges in Laguna (province)
2002 establishments in the Philippines
Education in San Pedro, Laguna
Educational institutions established in 2002